Harold LeBruce Gilmore (1912 – July 5, 1996) was an American politician. He served as a Democratic member of the Florida House of Representatives.

Life and career
Gilmore was born in Charleston, South Carolina. He moved to Live Oak, Florida in 1932. Gilmore established the company Huffman and Gilmore. He was a member of the Shriners Morocco Temple. Gilmore was also a member of the American Radio Relay League.

In 1945, he was elected to the Florida House of Representatives, Gilmore succeeding G. Warren "Bobby" Sanchez. In 1949, he was succeeded by William Randall Slaughter.

Gilmore died in July 1996 of cancer, at the age of 84. He was buried in Live Oak Cemetery.

References 

1912 births
1996 deaths
Politicians from Charleston, South Carolina
Deaths from cancer
Democratic Party members of the Florida House of Representatives
20th-century American politicians
Burials in Florida